is a Japanese artistic gymnast. She was part of the silver medalling team at the 2015 Summer Universiade in Gwangju, South Korea and the bronze medalling team at the 2014 Asian Games in Incheon also South Korea.

References

Japanese female artistic gymnasts
1997 births
Living people
Gymnasts at the 2014 Asian Games
Asian Games medalists in gymnastics
Asian Games bronze medalists for Japan
Medalists at the 2014 Asian Games
Universiade medalists in gymnastics
Universiade silver medalists for Japan
Medalists at the 2015 Summer Universiade
21st-century Japanese women